Iriana (also called Iriana Jokowi, born 1 October 1963) is the First Lady of Indonesia since 20 October 2014 and the wife of the current President of Indonesia, Joko Widodo.

Early career
Iriana graduated from State High School No. 3, Solo in 1983. She then studied at Muhammadiyah University of Surakarta for six semesters, but left without a degree to marry Joko Widodo.

While her husband served as governor of Jakarta, Iriana was appointed as leader of the Family Welfare Education organisation (Pembinaan Kesejahteraan Keluarga or PKK), a national women's movement in Indonesia. She also served as leader of the PKK in Surakarta from 2005 to 2012 when her husband was mayor of Surakarta.

Family
Iriana married Joko Widodo in Solo, Central Java, on 24 December 1986. They have two sons: Gibran Rakabuming (born 1 October 1987) and Kaesang Pangarep (born 25 December 1994) and one daughter named Kahiyang Ayu (born 30 April 1992).

References

|-

|-

Living people
1963 births
First ladies and gentlemen of Indonesia
Indonesian Muslims
Javanese people
People from Surakarta
Joko Widodo